When Harry Tries to Marry is a 2010 romantic comedy film, co-written, produced and directed by Nayan Padrai and starring Rahul Rai, Stefanie Estes, and Freishia Bomanbehram.

Development and release
Initially a featured screenplay project at the Sundance Institute Independent Producers’ Conference in 2004; and a top-ten finalist of the Creative Screenwriting contest in 2009, filming commenced on the film on October 21, 2009 in New York City, with additional location shooting in Kuch, India.

The film had its world premiere at the Austin Film Festival on October 22, 2010 and later played at the Mumbai Film Festival on October 27, 2010. Subsequently, the film won Best Film (Audience Award), Best Crossover Film, and Best New Talent (Rahul Rai) at the Gala Dinner held at BAFTA by the London Asian Film Festival. The film also won Best Feature Film (Comedy) at the Jersey Shore Film Festival, and was an official selection of the inaugural Gold Coast International Film Festival.

The film was released theatrically in the United States on April 22, 2011, and became available on video-on-demand and pay-per-view on August 1, 2011 in USA and Canada.

Cast
 Rahul Rai as Harry Shankar
 Stefanie Estes as Theresa
 Freishia Bomanbehram as Nita
 Osvaldo Hernandez Chavez as Louis
 Caitlin Gold as Mary
 Tony Mirrcandani as Dev Shankar
 Zenobia Shroff as Geeta Shankar
 Kanti Pandya as Pandit Deepak
 Micky Makhija as Commissioner Shah
 Grant Krethik as Slick Rick and Game Show Host
 Lauren LoGuidice as Angela
 Jagdish Patel as Chhotu

Soundtrack
The soundtrack of the motion picture features music by Sarah Sharp, The June Junes, Small*Star, Andrea Perry, Craig Marshall, Ter'ell Shahid, Shreya Goshal, Udit Narayan, Madhushree, and Rishikesh Kamkerkar.

Siddharth Kasyap was the music producer of the Indian music and background score composer.  Sarah Sharp was the music supervisor. Two music videos from the film's soundtrack have been released: "She's the Latest One" by The June Junes, and "Love is Everywhere" by Sarah Sharp.

References

External links
 
 

2010 films
Films about Indian Americans
American romantic comedy films
2010s English-language films
2010s American films